Carlos Berlanga, born Carlos García Berlanga, (11 August 1959 – 5 June 2002) was a Spanish musician, composer and painter.

Berlanga was born in Madrid, Spain. He died in Madrid at the age of 42 of liver disease. 

He was an influential figure in the Spanish music scene of the 1980s, especially in his various collaborations with the singer Alaska, such as Alaska y Dinarama and Alaska y los Pegamoides. He was the son of Luis García Berlanga, a Spanish film director.

References

1959 births
2002 deaths
Singers from Madrid
Rock en Español musicians
20th-century Spanish singers
20th-century Spanish male singers